The striped crake (Aenigmatolimnas marginalis) is a species of bird in the family Rallidae. It is the only species in the genus Aenigmatolimnas, having formerly been included in Porzana or in the defunct genus Poliolimnas. Its precise relationships, however, are still enigmatic.

Range
It is found in Cameroon, Comoros, Republic of the Congo, DRC, Ivory Coast, Gabon, Ghana, Kenya, Malawi, Namibia, Nigeria, Rwanda, Seychelles, South Africa, Tanzania, Uganda, Zambia, and Zimbabwe.

Vagrants have been recorded in Italy, Algeria, Morocco and Libya.

Gallery

References

External links
Image at ADW
 Striped crake - Species text in The Atlas of Southern African Birds.

striped crake
Birds of Sub-Saharan Africa
striped crake
Taxonomy articles created by Polbot
Taxobox binomials not recognized by IUCN